Kolno may refer to the following places:
Kolno, a town in Podlaskie Voivodeship (north-central Poland)
Kolno, Kuyavian-Pomeranian Voivodeship (north-central Poland)
Kolno, Wałcz County in West Pomeranian Voivodeship (north-west Poland)
Kolno, Masovian Voivodeship (east-central Poland)
Kolno, Konin County in Greater Poland Voivodeship (west-central Poland)
Kolno, Międzychód County in Greater Poland Voivodeship (west-central Poland)
Kolno, Warmian-Masurian Voivodeship (north Poland)
Kolno, Drawsko County in West Pomeranian Voivodeship (north-west Poland)
 Kolno, a village in Zhytkavichy Raion of Gomel Region (Belarus)

See also
, a Polish cargo ship in service 1947-71